The Crosman NightStalker is the first semi-automatic air rifle featuring blowback action. Released in the United States in 2005, the NightStalker uses an 88 gram CO2 powerlet as its power source.

It is a carbine of modern design, weighing . Its total length is just over thirty inches (76 cm); its rifled barrel is 16.75 inches (42.5 cm) long.

The front and rear sights use Crosman's Mohawk sight system which allows the user to alternate between two different diameters of windage adjustable peep sight while incorporating a front sight that is adjustable for elevation. A safety mechanism is provided by a cross bolt safety switch.

References
 Crosman Airguns, Air Rifles, Co2, NightStalker

See also
 Crosman

Pneumatic weapons
Air guns of the United States
Crosman guns